Laurence David Barron  (born 12 February 1944 in Southampton, England) has been Gardiner Professor of Chemistry at the University of Glasgow since 1998 (now Emeritus). He is a chemist who has conducted pioneering research into the properties of chiral (right- or left-handed) molecules — defined by Lord Kelvin as those that cannot be superimposed onto their mirror image. By extending this definition of chirality to include moving particles and processes that vary with time, he has made a fundamental theoretical contribution to the field. Chiral molecules such as amino acids, sugars, proteins, and nucleic acids play a central role in the chemistry of life, and many drug molecules are chiral. Laurence’s work on Raman optical activity — a spectroscopic technique capable of determining the three-dimensional structures of chiral molecules, which he predicted, observed, and applied to problems at the forefront of chemistry and structural biology — has led to its development as a powerful analytical tool used in academic and industrial laboratories worldwide. His much-cited book, Molecular Light Scattering and Optical Activity, has contributed to the growing impact of chirality on many areas of modern science.

Education
Laurence Barron attended King Edward VI School, Southampton and then studied chemistry at the Northern Polytechnic, where he earned a First Class Honours Degree of London University in 1965. 
He studied at Lincoln College, Oxford, with Peter Atkins earning a D.Phil. in 1969, on the theory of nonlinear optical activity and birefringence, and polarized light scattering generally.

Research 
Barron carried out post-doctoral research with A. David Buckingham, at Cambridge University, from 1969 to 1975, holding a Ramsay Memorial Fellowship in 1974–75.
In 1975, he joined the Chemistry Department of the University of Glasgow, as a lecturer. He was promoted to reader in 1980 and became titular professor in 1984. From 1995 to 2000 he held an EPSRC Senior Fellowship. He has held the Gardiner Chair of Chemistry from 1998 to 2008. He is now an emeritus professor and honorary senior research fellow in chemistry.
Barron is best known for his pioneering work on Raman optical activity, and was made a Fellow of the Royal Society on 26 May 2005. 

The idea that would eventually lead to Raman optical activity appeared for the first time during Barron’s D.Phil. research, when he discovered a new fundamental scattering process involving interference between light waves scattered via the molecular polarizability and optical activity tensors and which generates a small ellipticity/circularity in the scattered light. This was published with Peter Atkins in 1969. with the final definitive theory published with David Buckingham in 1971. The first observations, made in Buckingham’s laboratory, were published in 1973, and constituted the first observations of the long-sought optical activity in vibrational transitions of chiral molecules. Barron developed his extension of Lord Kelvin’s definition of chirality to include motion, first published in 1986 , in order to critically assess external physical influences able to induce an enantiomeric excess in reactions that would otherwise produce a racemic product, something that had been controversial ever since the time of Louis Pasteur and had resulted in many futile experiments.

Awards and recognition

2012, Zhang Dayu Memorial Lecture, CAS Dalian Institute of Chemical Physics, China
2012, Joshua Schechter Memorial Lecture, Bar Ilan University, Israel 
2011, Chirality Medal, 2011 
2008, Tetelman Visiting Fellow, Jonathan Edwards College, Yale University, USA 
2005, Elected Fellow of the Royal Society of Chemistry, FRSC
2005, Elected Fellow of the Institute of Physics, FInstP
2005, Elected Fellow of the Royal Society., FRS
2003, visiting professor, Universite Paul Sabatier, Toulouse, France
1998, Chemical Society of Zürich Lecture
1997, Guest Review Lecture, Association of Physicians of Great Britain and Ireland
1995, EPSRC Senior Fellow (1995–2000)
1995, Visiting Miller Research Professor, University of California, Berkeley, USA
1993, Sir Harold Thompson Award for Molecular Spectroscopy
1992, Elected Fellow of the Royal Society of Edinburgh, FRSE 
1987, F.L. Conover Memorial Lecture, Vanderbilt University, USA
1984, G.M.J. Schmidt Memorial Lecture, Weizmann Institute of Science, Israel. 
1977, Corday–Morgan Medal and Prize.

References

External links
Google scholar

Fellows of the Royal Society
Living people
1944 births
British physical chemists
Scientists from Southampton
Fellows of the Royal Society of Edinburgh